Saulius Šarkauskas (born 25 April 1970) is a Lithuanian former cyclist. He competed at the 1992 Summer Olympics and the 2000 Summer Olympics.

References

1970 births
Living people
Lithuanian male cyclists
Olympic cyclists of Lithuania
Cyclists at the 1992 Summer Olympics
Cyclists at the 2000 Summer Olympics
Sportspeople from Klaipėda